The 2007 European 10,000m Cup, was the 11th edition of the European 10,000m Cup took place on 7 April in Ferarra, Italy.

Individual

Men

Women

Team
In italic the participants whose result did not go into the team's total time, but awarded with medals.

References

External links
 EAA web site

European 10,000m Cup
European Cup 10,000m